Sophia Mendonça (born 6 February 1997) is a Brazilian author and internet celebrity. She is best known as one of the first content creators in her country to produce works starring autistic people and co-hosts the YouTube channel Mundo Autista (2015-present). In 2019, she won the Special Tribute award from the European Union program Erasmus+.

Biography 
Sophia Mendonça was born in Belo Horizonte, Minas Gerais, Brazil. She is the daughter of author and media personality Selma Sueli Silva, both are diagnosed with Autism spectrum. They have worked together on several projects.

Mendonça holds a bachelor's degree in Journalism and works as a software developer, as well as a researcher on the relationship between technology and communication.  She is a member of the research group Afetos, at the Federal University of Minas Gerais, which focuses on studies related to communication and vulnerabilities. Mendonça is also part of the UNESCO board of consultants.

Mendonça is widely known as one of the first autistic youtubers in Brazil for her work on the Youtube channel Mundo Autista, launched in 2015. She and co-host Selma Sueli Silva are also remembered as the longest-serving autistic brazilian vloggers on this platform. Mendonça also was the first transgender autistic to defend a master's degree in Brazil.

In 2017, Galileo magazine ranked Mundo Autista at position No. 8 among YouTube channels that address the lives of people with disabilities. In 2022, the website Canaltech ranked the channel as one of the top five on YouTube focusing on awareness of the Autistic Spectrum and highlighted it as the only one on the list aimed at autism in adults. In 2022, brazilian newspaper Catraca Livre listed her as one of the six autistic celebrities who challenge prejudice.

Mendonça's books and internet shows adressess diversity in the autistim spectrum. She brings to the discussion themes such as class, age, gender identity and sexual orientation and distances itself from the usual male and child characters. Her works revolve around autism spectrum and neurodiversity, affective and loving accessibility, gender issues, online ethnography, communication through digital media and life narratives.

As an exponent of the Affective Turn, Mendonça seeks a movement of integration with the characters she works with, which distances her from more traditional approaches to journalistic-academic texts and videos. In this way, her publications mainly focus on the tensioning of stereotypes and rooted perceptions about the autistic spectrum. In this way, she perceives interactions between excerpts of speeches from people available on the Internet and her own experiences. Her books, therefore, mix autobiographical testimonies with social aspects. Methodologically, Mendonça is based on the notion of fragments presented by the anthropologist Veena Das and on autoethnographic considerations, which aimed at understanding the experiences and challenges of the characters from their own perspective. 

Mendonça also observes how people construct their own narratives about life, which emerges spontaneously in a common conversation in digital media and reveals specific demands of people. Thus, Mendonça avoids building a hierarchy that separates her, as an author, from the experiences described by the characters. In addition to everyday topics, her books usually find inspiration in studies of communication and language, as well as in Buddhist philosophy. Early influences on Mendonça's writing style were the chick-lit authors Sophie Kinsella and Meg Cabot, whose works encouraged her to write about deep feelings with subtlety and touches of humor.

Awards and honors 
In 2016, Mendonça received the Grand Collar from Belo Horizonte, the highest honor of the municipal legislature, becoming the youngest person to receive this honor. In 2019, Mendonça received the Special Tribute from European Union program Erasmus+. The same year, she and Selma Sueli Silva won the Business Communication contest of the Diários Associados media conglomerate.

In 2022, her master's thesis on narratives by autistic and transgender people on Twitter was approved with academic honors by the Federal University of Minas Gerais. In 2023, Mundo Autista was one of the winners of the fifth influencers award promoted by the Center for Communication Studies and the Business Communication Platform, by popular and technical votes.

Personal life 

Mendonça learned that she was autistic at the age of 13, two years after she was diagnosed.  In 2021, she said that this diagnosis was liberating, but that the biggest "ghost" that accompanied her in life was not autism, but gender dysphoria, which is why she began to feel happier after the gender transition in 2020, because she sees gender expression as a way to communicate primarily with herself. Mendonça did a gender gender-affirming surgery in June 2022.

Since 2015, Mendonça has been a member of Soka Gakkai International, a Buddhist organization affiliated with the United Nations. In a 2023 interview, she revealed that SGI's humanist philosophy played an important role in her embracing female identity.

She dated screenwriter Marcos Maia in 2021, identifying him as a cisgender and straight man who was also an autistic person.

Works

References 

Living people
21st-century Brazilian writers
Brazilian Buddhists
Converts to Sōka Gakkai
Members of Sōka Gakkai
LGBT Buddhists
1997 births
People from Belo Horizonte
Federal University of Minas Gerais alumni
Transgender writers
Brazilian LGBT writers
People on the autism spectrum
Brazilian memoirists
21st-century women
Transgender women
Internet celebrities
Brazilian women novelists
Brazilian transgender people